Camille Serme (born 4 April 1989 in Créteil) is a former professional squash player from France. She reached a career-high world ranking of World No. 2 in February 2017.

Career
As a junior player, Camille Serme won three European Junior Championship titles in 2006, 2007 and 2008. And she was runner-up of the World Junior Championships in 2007 in Hong Kong against Raneem El Weleily.

In September 2010, she reached the semifinals of the Soho Square Women's World Open 2010. She was the first female French player to reach this level of competition. In 2012, she reached the final of the prestigious Hong Kong Open against Nicol David. Serme won a bronze medal at The World Games 2013 and also in 2013, she achieved three feats in quick succession. In September, she lost in the semifinals of the Malaysian Open against Nicol David. The following month in October, she reached the final of Carol Weymuller Open and then won the Monte Carlo Open beating Laura Massaro for the 2nd time in a row, the world #2, in the final 3-1.

In May 2015 she won the 2015 British Open, beating Laura Massaro in the final 3 games to 1. At that time it was the most important title of her career. In October 2016 she won the US Open beating Nour El Sherbini 3-1. Also in 2016, she was part of the French team that won the bronze medal at the 2016 Women's World Team Squash Championships in her home country.

Three months later her victory in the 2017 J.P. Morgan Tournament of Champions, her second consecutive PSA World Series event win, catapulted her up two places to a career high World No.2 on the February 2017 PSA Women's World Rankings. Serme also won the gold medal at the 2017 World Games in Wroclaw, Poland. In 2018, she was part of the French team that won the bronze medal at the 2018 Women's World Team Squash Championships. In May 2019, Serme lost in the final of the British Open 3-11, 8-11, 3-11 to Nouran Gohar of Egypt.

Serme won her second J.P. Morgan Tournament of Champions in January 2020 by beating Nour El Sherbini 11-8, 11-6, 11-7 in the final.

She retired in 2022.

Major World Series final appearances

British Open: 2 finals (1 title, 1 runner-up)

Hong Kong Open: 1 final (0 title, 1 runner-up)

US Open: 1 final (1 title, 0 runner-up)

J.P. Morgan Tournament of Champions: 2 finals (2 titles, 0 runner-up)

See also
 Official Women's Squash World Ranking
 WISPA Awards

References

External links 
 
 
 
 
 

French female squash players
Living people
1989 births
Sportspeople from Créteil
World Games bronze medalists
Competitors at the 2013 World Games
World Games gold medalists
Competitors at the 2017 World Games
World Games medalists in squash